Gryttjen is a lake located to the northeast of Järvsö in Gävleborg County, Sweden. It lies along Highway 84. Near its south shore is an island named Tjuvholmen.

External links
Geographic Names

Lakes of Gävleborg County